Cyrillia obesa is a species of sea snail, a marine gastropod mollusk in the family Raphitomidae.

Description

Distribution
This marine species occurs in the Atlantic Ocean off Norway.

References

 Høisæter T. (2016). A taxonomic review of the Norwegian species of Raphitoma (Gastropoda: Conoidea: Raphitomidae). Fauna Norvegica. 36: 9-32.

External links
 Fassio, G.; Russini, V.; Pusateri, F.; Giannuzzi-Savelli, R.; Høisæter, T.; Puillandre, N.; Modica, M. V.; Oliverio, M. (2019). An assessment of Raphitoma and allied genera (Neogastropoda: Raphitomidae). Journal of Molluscan Studies. 85(4): 414-425

obesa
Gastropods described in 2016